Delmont is a surname. Notable people with the surname include:

Andy Delmont (born 1985), Australian cricketer 
Édouard Delmont (1883–1955), French actor
Joseph Delmont (1873–1935),  Austrian film director
Matt Delmont, American historian
Mike Delmont (born 1940), American politician and law enforcement officer

See also
Delmonte, surname
del Monte (surname)

Catalan-language surnames